Julien Day School, Ganganagar is one of the four branches of Julien Day School.

History
It was established in 1976 by the Anglo-Indian Community. The school has rich cultural undertones and boasts of a 45 years old school culture. It is one of the first schools to be set up in North 24 Parganas District, and has had a significant impact on the development of Ganganagar as a town. Julien Day School has enormously benefited society by providing job opportunities and a growing business culture, leaving a mark on several lives and on society. It is a school that cares for their children, irrespective of caste and creed. Today, it continues to educate the newer generations to come.

Julien Day School, Ganganagar offers classes from KG to Grade XII and follows the ICSE Board. At the ISC level, it also offers Science, Commerce and Humanities streams.

See also
Education in India
List of schools in India
Education in West Bengal

References

External links

Educational institutions established in 1976
1976 establishments in West Bengal
Christian schools in West Bengal
Schools in North 24 Parganas district